Angelica Rubio (born May 30, 1979) is an American politician who has served in the New Mexico House of Representatives from the 35th district since 2017.

Early life
Rubio was born and raised in New Mexico by immigrant parents. She earned her undergraduate degree in Government at New Mexico State University in Las Cruces, before getting a master's degree in Latin American Studies from California State University in Los Angeles. Rubio cites Dolores Huerta as an inspiration in how she opened doors for Latina elected officials.

Career
Rubio has worked in Las Cruces on issues such as minimum wage, a City Council campaign for Kasandra Gandara, and the designation of an Organ Mountains-Desert Peaks National Monument. Rubio is the chair of the interim committee on Radioactive & Hazardous Materials. She has spoken against the Trump Border Wall, such as voting against allowing New Mexico state land to be used for its construction. Additionally, she introduced the approved House Bill 388, the gender-neutral bathroom bill, requiring New Mexico businesses and public facilities to label single-stall restrooms as gender neutral.

References

External links
 New Mexico State Legislature bio
 Angelica Rubio at Ballotpedia

1979 births
Living people
Hispanic and Latino American state legislators in New Mexico
Hispanic and Latino American women in politics
Democratic Party members of the New Mexico House of Representatives
21st-century American women politicians